This is a list of women writers who were born in the Faroe Islands or  whose writings are closely associated with that country.

D
Marianna Debes Dahl (born 1947), novelist, short story writer, children's writer, playwright, translator

G

Sigri Mitra Gaïni (born 1975), Norwegian-born Faroese poet, actress, teacher

H
Bergtóra Hanusardóttir (born 1946), novelist, short story writer, playwright, poet, women's rights activist, magazine editor
Guðrið Helmsdal (born 1941), poet, non-fiction writer, also writes in Danish, Norwegian and Icelandic
Rakel Helmsdal (born 1966), Danish-born Faroese children's writer, short story writer, playwright
Ebba Hentze (1930–2015), children's writer, poet, translator

J
Oddvør Johansen (born 1941), novelist, short story writer, children's writer

K
Sissal Kampmann (born 1974), poet
Marjun Syderbø Kjelnæs (born 1974), short story writer, children's writer

M
Sólrún Michelsen (born 1948), children's writer

O
Katrin Ottarsdóttir (born 1957), poet, film director

P
Helena Patursson (1864–1916), actress, feminist, essayist, columnist

S
Turið Sigurðardóttir (born 1946), educator, non-fiction writer, translator
Sigrið av Skarði Joensen (1908–1975), journalist, teacher, feminist

See also
List of Faroese people
List of Danish women writers
List of Danish writers
List of women writers

-
Faroese
Writers, women
Writers